Anna Grimaldi  (born 12 February 1997) is a New Zealand para-athlete, primarily competing in the long jump and sprint events. She has won two gold medals at Paralympics in the women's long jump: at the 2016 Summer Paralympics in Rio de Janeiro, and at the 2020 Summer Paralympics in Tokyo.

Personal life
Grimaldi was born in Dunedin to Tony and Di Grimaldi, and has one sister, Abby. She was born with a withered right forearm and no functional right hand.  She attended Bayfield High School in Dunedin; she played netball and basketball for the school and in her final year was a sports prefect. Grimaldi studied quantity surveying at Otago Polytechnic.

Athletics career
Grimaldi started para-athletics after attending a Paralympic talent identification event in October 2013. She initially was reluctant to attend, having had no formal athletics training and fearing she would be "shocking". She is classified T47 for track events and long jump, and F46 for field events. She won her first international competition medal, the bronze in the women's long jump T47, at the 2015 IPC Athletics World Championships in Doha, Qatar. She set a personal best of 5.41 m, while her second-best 5.38 m secured her the bronze medal over Russian Alexandra Moguchaya on countback. Grimaldi also placed fifth in the women's 200 metres T47 final.

Her long jump distance at the 2015 World Championships ranked her in the top five in the long jump T47 during the Paralympics qualifying period, earning her a slot at the 2016 Summer Paralympics in Rio de Janeiro. She was officially confirmed to represent New Zealand at the Paralympics on 23 May 2016. At the Paralympics, she won the gold medal in the women's long jump T47 with a distance of 5.62 m, breaking her personal best by 21 cm. She also placed fourth in the women's 100 metres T47 final, and competed in the 200 metres T47 where she was disqualified in the heat for a lane infringement.

At the 2017 World Para Athletics Championships, Grimaldi ran the 200 m heats before pulling out of the 200 m final and 100 m due to a recurring foot injury in order to concentrate on the long jump. She placed fourth in the long jump, missing the medals by one centimetre.

Returning to New Zealand after the 2017 championships, Grimaldi's foot injury was discovered to be a stress fracture in her left navicular bone. She subsequently missed the entire 2018 season.

At the 2019 World Para Athletics Championships, Grimaldi placed second with a distance of 5.50 m, two centimetres behind Kiara Rodriguez of Ecuador.

At the 2021 Otago Athletics Championships Grimaldi set a personal best of 5.91 m, ten centimetres short of the T47 world record and placing her second in the overall (able-bodied and para) annual national rankings. At the delayed 2020 Summer Paralympics, Grimaldi won the gold medal in the women's long jump T47 with a distance of 5.76 m, setting a new Paralympic Games record.

Awards 
Grimaldi was appointed a Member of the New Zealand Order of Merit in the 2017 New Year Honours, for her services to athletics.

Statistics

Personal bests

Long jump seasonal bests

Source: Athletics New Zealand Records and Rankings

References

External links
 
Anna Grimaldi at Athletics New Zealand
  (archive)
 Meet Our Paralympians: Anna Grimaldi – Attitude Live video profile

Athletes (track and field) at the 2016 Summer Paralympics
Living people
Medalists at the 2016 Summer Paralympics
Members of the New Zealand Order of Merit
New Zealand female long jumpers
New Zealand female sprinters
Paralympic athletes of New Zealand
Paralympic gold medalists for New Zealand
Paralympic medalists in athletics (track and field)
Athletes from Dunedin
1997 births
Athletes (track and field) at the 2020 Summer Paralympics
Medalists at the 2020 Summer Paralympics